X-Men, also known as X-Men: The Animated Series, is an animated superhero television series which debuted on October 31, 1992, in the United States on the Fox Kids Network. X-Men was Marvel Comics' second attempt at an animated X-Men TV series after the pilot, X-Men: Pryde of the X-Men, was not picked up.

A Marvel Studios-produced revival, X-Men '97, is scheduled to be released to Disney+ in 2023.

Production 
In 1991, Margaret Loesch became head of Fox Children's Network. Having championed the Pryde of the X-Men pilot in 1989, she was quick to set up an order for 13 episodes of X-Men. Saban Entertainment was contracted to produce the show and hired a small studio Graz Entertainment to produce the episodes as it did not have sufficient staff at the time to handle production in house. Graz employed the creative staff, wrote and designed each episode, and drew the storyboards. The voice work was done using Canadian studios and South Korean studio AKOM was hired to animate the episodes. X-Men was originally to premiere over the Labor Day weekend in September; due to production delays, it was pushed to the end of October. When the animation team AKOM turned in the first episode, it contained hundreds of animation errors, which AKOM refused to fix. Because of time constraints, the episode was aired in an unfinished form. The second episode was turned in just before a deadline, with 50 scenes missing and only a single day reserved for editing. The "Night of the Sentinels" two-part episode originally aired as a "sneak preview" on October 31.

Because of the production delays and animation errors in these two episodes, Fox threatened to sever AKOM's contracts. When Fox re-aired the pilot in early 1993, the errors were corrected. The series earned top ratings throughout its first season, and was renewed for a second season of 13 episodes. Throughout the series run, producers had to deal with quality control issues including attempts to cut costs, requests to change the tone of the series to something more child-friendly as well to integrate toys being sold into the show.

The show was originally planned to run for 65 episodes. Given its success and Marvel's bankruptcy, Saban funded the additional eleven episodes at a much-reduced budget. Philippine Animation Studio and Hong Ying Animation also contributed some of the animation for this series.

The series was added to the Disney+ streaming service when it launched on November 12, 2019, with a revival subsequently announced to be in development.

Synopsis 

The show features X-Men similar in look and line-up to the early 1990s X-Men drawn by Jim Lee (specifically, the Blue Team established in the early issues of X-Men (vol. 2)), composed of Cyclops, Wolverine, Rogue, Storm, Beast, Gambit, Jubilee, Jean Grey, Professor X, as well as an original character, Morph (an adaptation of previous X-Men member Changeling).

The series deals with social issues, including divorce ("Proteus"), Christianity ("Nightcrawler" and "Bloodlines"), the Holocaust ("Enter Magneto", "Deadly Reunions", "Days of Future Past" and "The Phalanx Covenant") and AIDS hysteria ("Time Fugitives"), and feelings of loneliness ("No Mutant Is an Island"). Television was satirized in the episodes "Mojovision" and "Longshot".

X-Men crossed over with the animated series Spider-Man, when Spider-Man seeks out the X-Men's help to stave off his progressing mutation. In the abbreviated form of the Secret Wars storyline, the Beyonder and Madame Web selected Spider-Man to lead a team of heroes including Storm against a group of villains. An earlier draft of "Secret Wars" involved all of the X-Men, but transporting the voice cast from Canada to Los Angeles, where production for the Spider-Man animated series was based, had been too costly in previous crossovers, so the episode was re-written to include only Storm, whose actress, Iona Morris, lived in Los Angeles. Hulk and She-Hulk were excluded from the episodes because the Incredible Hulk animated series featuring the characters was airing on rival network UPN.

The first season of the show brought the X-Men into conflict with human conspirators building mutant-exterminating Sentinel robots, Magneto and his attempts to instigate a human-mutant war, and the powerful mutant Apocalypse's plans to eradicate the weak, both human and mutant alike. Other storylines including X-Men member Morph's death at the hands of Sentinels, Beast's incarceration, and an assassination attempt on US senator Kelly by Apocalypse's minions to turn human sentiment against the mutants.

The second season sees Cyclops and Jean get married and become the targets of Mister Sinister, who hopes to use the genetically perfect combination of their DNA to create an army of obedient mutants. Morph returns, having been rescued by Sinister and brainwashed into forcing the X-Men apart. The season also features the growing rift between humans and mutants, spearheaded by the Friends of Humanity, an anti-mutant group who lead the persecution of all mutants. Apocalypse also returns, developing a deadly plague to be blamed on mutants, fueling mutant hatred. A parallel narrative of Professor X and Magneto being lost in the Savage Land runs throughout this season.

The third season focuses on the cosmic force, the Phoenix, which merges with Jean Grey and eventually turns her into the malevolent and powerful Dark Phoenix. The season also introduced the Shi'ar Empire who want to stop the Dark Phoenix, including Lilandra and Gladiator. Other storylines include the introduction of Wolverine's former lover turned mercenary, Lady Deathstrike, former X-Men member Iceman, and the villainous Shadow King.

Volume 5 of the Official Handbook of the Marvel Universe A-Z Hardcovers lists the X-Men cartoon as part of the Marvel multiverse, inhabiting Earth-92131. Also, the plague-infested future that Bishop tried to prevent in Season 2 is listed as Earth-13393 while Cable's release of the immediate cure of the plague is listed as Earth-121893.

Adaptations 
Although the majority of the series' stories are original, a number of storylines and events from the comics are loosely adapted in the series, such as:

Season 1 
 The two-part Pilot episode "Night of the Sentinels" features "The Mutant Registration Act" which was first used in "Days of Future Past" from Uncanny X-Men #141 (January, 1981) by writer Chris Claremont and writer/artist John Byrne. Also the battle at the shopping mall is adapted from Jubilee's first appearance in the story "Ladies' Night" from Uncanny X-Men #244 (May, 1989) by writer Chris Claremont and artist Marc Silvestri. In that story, Jubilee is attacked by the M-Squad and is rescued by female X-Men and the final sequence wherein Jubilee arrives at the X-Mansion is based on a similar sequence when Kitty Pryde first arrived at the X-Mansion following the funeral for Phoenix in "Elegy" from X-Men #138 (October, 1980) by writer Chris Claremont and writer/artist John Byrne.
 The episode, "Enter Magneto", features a confrontation at a missile base: this is largely based on the X-Men's first battle with Magneto, as told in their 1963 debut story "X-Men" from X-Men #1 (September, 1963) by writer Stan Lee and artist Jack Kirby.
 "Captive Hearts" is loosely based on events depicted in "Catacombs" and "Dancin' in the Dark" from Uncanny X-Men #169-170 (May–June, 1983) by writer Chris Claremont and artist Paul Smith, except that the X-Man kidnapped by The Morlocks in those stories was Angel, rather than Cyclops.
 In the episode "Slave Island", Genosha's treatment of mutants as slave labour is adapted from "Welcome to Genosha"/"Busting Loose"/"Who's Human?"/"Gonna be a Revolution" from Uncanny X-Men #235-#238 (October–November, 1989) by writer Chris Claremont and artists Rick Leonardi and Marc Silvestri. However, the premise of how the Genoshan's enslaved mutants is greatly retooled, likely to be more appropriate for children's television.
 In the episode "The Unstoppable Juggernaut", The Juggernaut's origins is adapted from the story "The Origin of Professor X!" from X-Men #12 (July, 1965) by Writer Stan Lee and artists Jack Kirby and Alex Toth. Also, the X-Men clashing with Juggernaut at the bank is adapted loosely from the story "Juggernaut's Back in Town" from Uncanny X-Men #194 by writer Chris Claremont and artist John Romita Jr., particularly the portions where the X-Men are staking out the bank before the Juggernaut attacks and the origin of Colossus is adapted from Deadly Genesis! in Giant-Size X-Men #1 (May, 1975) by Writer Len Wein and artist Dave Cockrum.
 "The Cure" features a flashback to Rogue's origins detailing her kiss with Cody Robbins, which is adapted from "Public Enemy" from Uncanny X-Men #185 (September, 1984) by writer Chris Claremont and artist John Romita Jr.
 Apocalypse's creation of his Four Horsemen in "Come the Apocalypse" is very loosely adapted from Issues #10 "Falling Angel!", #12 "Boom Boom Boom!", #15 "Whose Death is it, Anyway?", #19 "All Together Now!" and #24 "Masks" from X-Factor by writer Louise Simonson artists Walter Simonson and Marc Silvestri.
 The first part of the 2-part episode story "Days of Future Past" is loosely based on X-Men #141 (January, 1981) by writer Chris Claremont and writer/artist John Byrne, the first part of the "Days of Future Past" story arc. The entire story was retooled to fit the continuity established in the animated series, however some original elements remained such as Wolverine leading a resistance against the Sentinels. However Bishop's role as a tracker of Mutant rebels is reminiscent of Rachel Summer's role as a Hound, likely adapted from Uncanny X-Men #189. Similarly, Bishop's betrayal of the Sentinels and travel back in time is adapted from Kate Pryde's similar stunt in X-Men #141 (January, 1981) by Chris Claremont and writer/artist John Byrne. Nimrod's appearance and battle with the X-Men is likely adapted from "Raiders of the Lost Temple!" in Uncanny X-Men #191 (March, 1985) and 194 (June, 1985) by writer Chris Claremont and artist John Romita Jr. Also, Bishops' assertion that Gambit betrayed the X-Men is adapted from "Bishop to King's Five!" from Uncanny X-Men #287 (April, 1992) by writers Jim Lee, Scott Lobdell and artist John Romita Jr., wherein Bishop's future the X-Men were apparently killed by one of their own, and as Gambit was the only survivor Bishop long suspected him of betraying the X-Men.
 The second part of "Days of Future Past" is adapted from "Mind Out of Time" from Uncanny X-Men #142 (February, 1981) by Chris Claremont and writer/artist John Byrne, wherein the X-Men prevent the Brotherhood of Evil Mutants from assassinating Senator Robert Edward Kelly. The story was altered to fit the continuity of the animated series, wherein Bishop takes the place of Kate Pryde, however it deviates from the original story when Magneto abducts Kelly.
 The entire Sentinel plot from the episode "The Final Decision", including Master Mold forcing Trask to do his bidding is adapted from "Among Us Stalk... the Sentinels"/"Prisoners of the Mysterious Master Mold!"/"The Supreme Sacrifice!" from X-Men #14–16 (November 1965 – January 1966) by writer Stan Lee and artists Jack Kirby & Jay Gavin. Whilst Scott's marriage proposal to Jean and Mister Sinister's interest, which is explored fully in Season 2, is very loosely adapted on "Inferno, Part the Fourth: Ashes!" from Uncanny X-Men #243 (April, 1989) by writer Chris Claremont and artist Marc Silvestri, among other issues where Sinister manipulated Scott's marriage to Madelyne Pryor for his own twisted ends.

 Season 2 
 The episode "Whatever It Takes" features a flashback depicting Mjnari's birth is based on the story "Life-Death II: From the Heart of Darkness" from Uncanny X-Men #198 (October, 1985) by writer Chris Claremont and artist Barry Windsor-Smith. In that story, Storm discovered Shani's tribe after losing her mutant powers, and resuscitated Shani's (unnamed) son as in this episode. The story also featured a tribal elder named MjNari, who chose to die when Shani's son was born, so that the tribe would not become too numerous for its resources.
 The episode "Repo Man" is based on "Shoot-Out at the Stampede!" from Uncanny X-Men #121 (May, 1979) by writer Chris Claremont, Writer/artist John Byrne and artist Terry Austin.  The episode is also based on the "Weapon X" story from Marvel Comics Presents #72-84 (March–September 1991) by writer/artist Barry Windsor-Smith.
 The episode "X-Ternally Yours" is based upon the "Gambit" 4 issue mini-series featuring "Tithing"/"Honor Amongst Thieves"/"The Benefactress"/"Thief of Time" (which was published literally around the same time that episode first aired) (December, 1993–March, 1994) by Writer Howard Mackie, artists Lee Weeks and Klaus Janson. Though in the comics Gambit's brother is named Henri instead of Bobby.
 In "Time Fugitives (parts 1 & 2)" features a variation of the "Legacy Virus" story line where it was the creation of Apocalypse, who had created the virus with the aid of Graydon Creed and the Friends of Humanity, infecting innocent people and claiming that mutants were the ones who had caused the plague. In an attempt to stop the plague, Bishop came back from the future to destroy Apocalypse's work before the virus could move on to mutants, but as a result vital antibodies that would allow the mutant race to survive future plagues were never created. Traveling back from even further in the future, Cable was able to come up with a compromise that allowed both Bishop's and his own missions to succeed; although the plague never made the jump to mutants on a large-scale basis, Cable nevertheless ensured that Wolverine would be infected, thus creating the necessary antibodies while not killing any mutants thanks to Wolverine's healing factor.
 Parts of the episode "A Rogue's Tale" are based on "Rogue Redux" in Uncanny X-Men #269 (October, 1990) by writer Chris Claremont and artists Jim Lee and Art Thibe. Whilst other parts of the episode are based on "By Friends – Betrayed!" in Avengers Annual #10 (August, 1981) by writer Chris Claremont and artists Michael Golden and Armando Gil.

 Season 3 
 "The Phoenix Saga (Part 1): Sacrifice" is loosely based on "My Brother, My Enemy!" from Uncanny X-Men #97 (February, 1976) by writer Chris Claremont and artists Dave Cockrum & Sam Grainger. The story is also based on "Deathstar, Rising!"/"Greater Love Hath No X-Man..." from Uncanny X-Men #99-100  (June/August 1976) and "Phoenix Unleashed!" from Uncanny X-Men #105 (June, 1977) all by writer Chris Claremont and artist Dave Cockrum.
 "The Phoenix Saga (Part 2): The Dark Shroud" is loosely based on "Like a Phoenix, from the Ashes" from Uncanny X-Men #101 (October, 1976) by writer Chris Claremont and artist Dave Cockrum. As well as "Dark Shroud of the Past!" from Uncanny X-Men #106 (August, 1977) by writers Chris Claremont & Bill Mantlo and artist Dave Cockrum & William Robert Brown.
 "The Phoenix Saga (Part 3): The Cry of the Banshee" is loosely based on "Who Will Stop the Juggernaut?"/"The Fall of the Tower"/"The Gentleman's Name is Magneto" from Uncanny X-Men #102-104 (December, 1976-April, 1977) by writer Chris Claremont and artists Dave Cockrum & Sam Grainger.
 "The Phoenix Saga (Part 4): The Starjammers" is loosely based on "Where No X-Man Has Gone Before!" from Uncanny X-Men #107 (October, 1977) by writer Chris Claremont and artists Dave Cockrum and Dan Green.
 "The Phoenix Saga (Part 5): Child of Light" is loosely based on "Armageddon Now" from Uncanny X-Men #108 (December, 1977) by Writer Chris Claremont and artists John Byrne & Terry Austin.
 "The Dark Phoenix Saga (Part 1): Dazzled" is both based heavily and loosely on different areas, of the storylines "Dazzler"/"Run for Your Life!"/ "And Hellfire is Their Name!" from Uncanny X-Men #130-132 (February–April, 1980) written by Chris Claremont & John Byrne, with art by John Byrne & Terry Austin.
 "The Dark Phoenix Saga (Part 2): The Inner Circle" is based on "Wolverine: Alone!" in Uncanny X-Men #133 (May, 1980) & "Too Late, the Heroes!" in #134 Uncanny X-Men (June, 1980). The battle with the Inner Circle follows the original comics very closely, with Beast taking the role of Nightcrawler (when juggling Shaw), and Rogue taking the role of Colossus (tearing the arm off Pierce). The comic was created by writers Chris Claremont & John Byrne, with art by John Byrne & Terry Austin.
 "The Dark Phoenix Saga (Part 3): The Dark Phoenix" is based on "Dark Phoenix" from Uncanny X-Men #135 (July, 1980) and "Child of Light and Darkness!" in Uncanny X-Men #136 (August, 1980) by writers Chris Claremont & John Byrne, with art by John Byrne & Terry Austin.
 "The Dark Phoenix Saga (Part 4): The Fate of the Phoenix" is based on the comic of the same name ("The Fate of the Phoenix!") from Uncanny X-Men #137 (September, 1980) by writers Chris Claremont & John Byrne, with art by John Byrne & Terry Austin.
 The episode "Orphan's End" is based on "Reunion" in Uncanny X-Men #154 and "First Blood" in Uncanny X-Men #155 by writer Chris Claremont and artist Dave Cockrum.

 Season 4 
 The "One Man's Worth" two-parter is an original story, greenlit and designed for the TV series in January, 1994.  In a reversal of the usual book-to-TV origin, this story became the basis and inspiration for the crossover series of books Age of Apocalypse, which was published in 1995–96. Many character designs in the Age of Apocalypse, most prominently that of the alternate Forge, were first created for the TV series.  Because of the length of time it takes to animate an ambitious episode (sometimes a full year), these two creations are often placed in the wrong order.  Bob Harras, supervisor of the X-books in the mid-90s and advisor to the TV series, had access to the full "One Man's Worth" story and designs by early May, 1994.  The Age of Apocalypse books followed eight months later.
 "Sanctuary (Part 1)" is loosely based on "Rubicon" from X-Men (Vol 2) #1 (October, 1991) and "Firestorm" from X-Men (Vol 2) #2 (November, 1991) from the X-Men: Legacy series and the "Fatal Attractions" crossover storyline. The comic book story was written by writer Chris Claremont and writer/artist Jim Lee with artist Scott Williams.
 "Sanctuary (Part 2)" is loosely based on "Fallout!" from X-Men (Vol 2) #3 (December, 1991) from the X-Men: Legacy series and the "Fatal Attractions" crossover storyline. The comic book story was written by Chris Claremont and writer/artist Jim Lee with art by Scott Williams.
 The episode "Weapon X, Lies, & Videotape" is loosely based on the story-lines "The Shiva Scenario Part 1: Dreams of Gore, Phase 1"/"Shiva Scenario Part 2: Dreams of Gore: Phase Two"/"The Shiva Scenario Part 3: Dreams of Gore: Phase 3" from Wolverine #48–50 (November, 1992-January 1993) which were all written by Larry Hama with art by Marc Silvestri. There was also a bit of the story-lines "Nightmare Quest!"/"Reunion!"/"Bastions of Glory!"/"What Goes Around..." from issues #61-64 (September–December 1992) thrown in, (though the robot Talos is called "Shiva" there, and the Weapon X project has more members) these issues were written by Larry Hama with art by Mark Texeira.

 Season 5 
 The two-part final season opener "Phalanx Covenant" was adapted from the comic of the same name (September–October 1994) with Beast as the central character. The Phalanx were conceived to be fully alien and not mutant hating humans who were infected with the technology, becoming more like the Technarchy, with Cameron Hodge working along with them serving much the same role as in the comics. During the two-parter, Beast teams up with Warlock, Forge (part of X-Factor), Mr Sinister, Amelia Voght (who was working on Muir Island at the time) and Magneto.
 The episode "Jubilee's Fairytale Theater" is based on "Kitty's Fairy Tale" from Uncanny X-Men #153 (January, 1982) by writer Chris Claremont and artist Dave Cockrum. The comic featured Kitty Pryde telling a fairytale to Illyana Rasputina, whilst the series replaced Kitty Pryde with Jubilee and Illyana Rasputina with random school children.
 The episode "Old Soldiers" is loosely based on "Madripoor Knights" from Uncanny X-Men #268 (September, 1990) by writer Chris Claremont and artists Jim Lee & Scott Williams. It tells the tale of Logan, while acting as a special operative for Canada, teaming up with Captain America and the Howling Commandos during World War II to rescue someone who had been captured by Red Skull. Logan would use detachable metal claws to scale the side of a mountain and then comment how he liked them.

 Voice cast 

The series' voice acting was recorded in Toronto studios, with Dan Hennessey serving as voice director. Toronto voice actors had been already used for the 1960s Marvel Comics cartoons.

 Principal cast 
 Scott Summers / Cyclops (Norm Spencer): The field commander of the X-Men whose eyes can emit a powerful burst of energy that can cause devastating damage. Generally stiff, he has expressed doubts to his own leadership from time to time. He often fights with Logan over his girlfriend, Jean Grey, whom he eventually marries towards the end of the series.
 James "Logan" Howlett / Wolverine (Cal Dodd): A hot headed mutant with a regenerative healing factor, heightened senses, an adamantium-laced skeleton that render his bones virtually indestructible, and retractable claws capable of cutting virtually anything. He was attracted to Jean Grey but decided not to come against Scott Summers, and is a father figure for Jubilee.
 Anna Marie / Rogue (Lenore Zann): A mutant who possesses the uncontrollable ability to absorb the memories, powers and energy of those she touches; however, if Rogue holds onto someone too long, their consciousness will be trapped in her subconscious. She has permanently absorbed the superhuman strength, durability and flight of Carol Danvers / Ms. Marvel who was left comatose due to this. She is in a romantic relationship with Gambit.
 Ororo Munroe / Storm (Iona Morris (1992–1994), Alison Sealy-Smith (1993–1997)): A mutant who is able to control the weather, using it to injure her foes or fly and is third in command of the X-Men. Storm has to remain in constant control of her emotions, as they are linked to her powers; if she let loose, she would cause horrific weather conditions that would put lives in jeopardy.
 Dr. Henry Phillip "Hank" McCoy / Beast (George Buza): A mutant whose body is covered in fur and granted superhuman strength and agility to complement his genius mind. He spends most of season one imprisoned for destroying the government's records of registered mutants, which was being abused by Henry Gyrich and Bolivar Trask. Buza would later appear in a small role in the 2000 live action film as a truck driver.
 Remy Etienne LeBeau / Gambit (Chris Potter (1992–1996), Tony Daniels (1997)): A mutant who can charge virtually any object with explosive energy as bombs that only explode once he lets go of the object. He also wields a staff for close combat, and for when he's out of playing cards to throw. Gambit is in a romantic relationship with Rogue. Potter was cast while filming Kung Fu: The Legend Continues in Toronto; unfamiliar with the X-Men, his co-star David Carradine was a big fan of the comics. Potter later auditioned for the role of Cyclops in the 2000 film. 
 Jubilation Lee / Jubilee (Alyson Court): The newest and youngest member of the X-Men. She is close to Wolverine as a father figure. She is still getting used to her powers, which are the ability to generate firework-like explosions. Court and Dodd had been neighbors when Court was still a child and Dodd was already a well-known actor in Canada. Court attributes their characters' chemistry to being previously acquainted with one another. Originally another voice actor had been cast as Jubilee, but Court was cast when the original voice was deemed too sweet and innocent sounding for the role.
 Jean Grey / Phoenix (Catherine Disher): A telekinetic and telepath. She is in a longstanding relationship with Cyclops, and they marry in season four, when she is captured by Apocalypse in the time space continuum. Disher had originally auditioned for the part of Storm.
 Prof. Charles Francis Xavier / Professor X (Cedric Smith): The founder and leader of the X-Men and a powerful telepath. Throughout the series, he fights for mutant rights while teaching his students the importance of never giving into temptation or lose sight of what really matters.
 Eric Magnus Lensherr / Magneto (David Hemblen): A mutant with the power to control metal. He is initially introduced as an antagonist but he is more of an anti-hero in later seasons, helping defeat other villains including Master Mold, Mister Sinister, Apocalypse, and Phalanx.

 Additional cast 

 Philip Akin: Lucas Bishop / Bishop
 Lawrence Bayne: Nathan Summers / Cable,Steve Rogers / Captain America, Fabian Cortez
 Brian Taylor (actor): Christopher Summers / Corsair
 Rick Bennett: Cain Marko / Juggernaut, Piotr Rasputin / Colossus (first time)
 Nigel Bennett: Jason Wyngarde / Master Mind
 James Blendick: En Sabah Nur / Apocalypse (second time)
 Christopher Britton: Mister Sinister
 Lally Cadeau: Dr. Moira MacTaggert, Phalanx Nexus
 Robert Cait: Fred Dukes / Blob, Colossus (second time)
 Len Carlson: Senator Robert Kelley, additional voices
 Randall Carpenter: Raven Darkholme / Mystique (Season 1)
 John Colicos: En Sabah Nur / Apocalypse (first time), High Evolutionary
 Rod Coneybeare: Avalanche
 Jennifer Dale: Raven Darkholme / Mystique (Seasons 2–5)
 Adrian Egan: Samuel Guthrie / Cannon Ball
 Barry Flatman: James Hudson / Vindicator, Henry Peter Gyrich
 David Fox: Sentinels, Master Mold
 Don Francks: Graydon Creed Sr. / Sabretooth, Eugene Milton Judd / Puck
 Catherine Gallant: Famine
 Paul Haddad: Quicksilver / Pietro Maximoff, Arkon, Kiyoek, additional voices 

 Graham Haley: St. John Allerdyce / Pyro
 Brett Halsey: Bolivar Trask
 Roscoe Handford: Carol Danvers / Ms. Marvel
 Dan Hennessey: Ruckus, Sunder
 Rebecca Jenkins: Heather Hudson
 Lorne Kennedy: Apocalypse (third time) 
 Judy Marshak: Plague / Pestilence
 George Merner
 Jim Millington: War
 Stephen Ouimette: Warren Worthington III / Angel / Archangel, Cameron Hodge / Phalanx
 Ross Petty: Ape
 Jeremy Ratchford: Sean Cassidy / Banshee
 Rob Rubin: Morph
 John Stocker: Grayson Creed Jr., Leech
 Stuart Stone: Kevin MacTaggert / Proteus
 Marc Strange: Forge
 Kay Trembley: Annalee, Shard Bishop / Shard
 Rod Wilson: Gorgeous George

 Other versions 
The original opening sequence features the X-Men demonstrating their mutant abilities to a now very distinctive instrumental theme (written by Ron Wasserman). This intro is used throughout the first four seasons. A modified version is eventually introduced in season five, episode one ("Phalanx Covenant, Part One"). In this new intro, the beginning of the theme is slightly changed. When UPN began airing repeats on Sunday mornings, an alternate credits sequence was used: a high-quality Japanese-animated version of the original opening. This modified version occasionally appears in the digital streaming release of the show, which was used for re-runs on Toon Disney.

In Italy, the series was aired in 1994 on Canale 5, and the intro and outro sequences were replaced by a new sequence and a new theme-song Insuperabili X-Men, sung by Marco Destro and Pietro Ubaldi (Hank McCoy Italian voice actor).

X-Men originally aired on TV Tokyo from 1994 through 1995. For the TV Tokyo dub of the series, the intro was replaced with a new, Japanese-animated sequence as well as a new theme called "Rising" (ライジング), by the band Ambience (アンビエンス). Starting with episode 42, a second new intro was used, featuring the song "Dakishimetai Dare Yori Mo" (抱きしめたい誰よりも...). The end credits sequence was also changed: it featured shots of American X-Men comic books set to the song "Back to You" (バック･トウ･ユー), also by Ambience.

The TV Tokyo dub was directed by Yoshikazu Iwanami and featured scripts rewritten to include a more humorous, self-satirical tone as well as an emphasis on comical adlibbing (a hallmark of Iwanami's dubbing style). Episodes were edited for time so that new segments could be added to the end which promoted the X-Men: Children of the Atom video game from Capcom. The dub actors would pretend to play the game as their characters and make humorous asides and remarks. X-Men was dubbed a second time in the early 2000s for broadcast on Toon Disney (Japan). This dub was more faithful to the original English scripts and episodes were not cut for time. The Toon Disney version used the original American intro and end credits rather than the unique ones created for the TV Tokyo version.

Two versions of the episode "No Mutant is an Island" exist with completely different animation. The first version was aired for Toon Disney re-runs and can be seen in digital streaming services such as Amazon Video, aired on Fox Kids in the United States, and uses the remixed intro theme from Season 5. The second version is available on region 1 DVD, aired on Fox Kids overseas, and uses the default intro theme from Seasons 1–4.

 Viewership
In its prime, X-Men garnered very high ratings for a Saturday morning cartoon, and it received praise for adapting many different storylines from the comics. Haim Saban credits the success of the series in assisting him to sell his next project to Fox, the live action series Mighty Morphin Power Rangers.

X-Men reached a viewership of over  households.

 Legacy 
 Revival 
By 2019, there were talks ongoing with Disney+ to revive the series. In November 2021, a revival titled X-Men '97 was revealed to premiere on the service in 2023, which will continue the plot of the series. Beau DeMayo will serve as head writer, with most of the surviving cast members of the original series reprising their roles, including Dodd, Zann, Buza, Disher, Potter, Sealy-Smith, Hough, and Britton. They will be joined by Jennifer Hale, Anniwaa Buachie, Ray Chase, Matthew Waterson, JP Karliak, Holly Chou, Jeff Bennett, and A. J. Locascio; Court will not be reprising her role as Jubilee, and will instead voice another character as she asked for Jubilee to be voiced by an Asian actress. The series will be produced by Marvel Studios Animation, but will not take place within the Marvel Cinematic Universe.

 Comics 
 X-Men Adventures X-Men Adventures was a comic book spin-off of the animated series. Beginning in November 1992, it adapted the first three seasons of the show; in April 1996, it became Adventures of the X-Men, which contained original stories set within the same continuity. The comic book lasted until March 1997, shortly after the show's cancellation by the Fox Network.

 Bibliography
 X-Men Adventures vol. 1 (1992–94) (15 issues)
 X-Men Adventures vol. 2 (1994–95) (13 issues)
 X-Men Adventures vol. 3 (1995–96) (13 issues)
 Adventures of the X-Men (1996–97) (12 issues)

Additionally, stories featuring the same characters were print through the 19 issues run of Spider-Man Magazine, published between March 1994 and March 1997, alongside stories inspired by the animated series Spider-Man.

 X-Men '92 
The comic book series X-Men '92 was first released as one of the many tie-in titles for Marvel's 2015 Secret Wars event, and continued in its second volume as a regular series in early 2016, starring characters of the TV show's reality.

In January 2022 Marvel announced a new series inspired by the cartoon, X-Men '92: House of XCII'''. Scheduled for publication in April of that same year, the series will explore an alternate universe where the events of Jonathan Hickman's House of X and Powers of X happened decades earlier, in the '90s of the original show.

 Books 
 Previously on X-Men 
In 2017, series developer and showrunner Eric Lewald released the book Previously on X-Men: The Making of an Animated Series, which features his interviews with 36 of the staff and voice cast behind the TV series, as well as Lewald's personal experiences on the series' development and production.

 X-Men: The Art and Making of The Animated Series 
In 2020, Eric Lewald and Julia Lewald released the book X-Men: The Art and Making of The Animated Series, which features previously unseen concept art, storyboards, character models, background layouts, animation cels, and other production/promotional materials, along with new interviews with the series principal artists and production staff.

 Video games 

 X-Men Cartoon Maker: The PC game X-Men Cartoon Maker was a recreational software package that allowed the user to create animations with a minimal level of sophistication by utilizing a library of backdrops, animations and sound effects from the show. Wolverine and Storm (voice-only) help you out.
 Capcom's VS. Series: The characters in the series were licensed by Capcom and were the inspiration for the video game X-Men: Children of the Atom, which in turn would be the basis for the Marvel vs. Capcom sub-series of video games. Most of the voice actors who did the voices in the series reprised their roles for the video game. Capcom would continue to use these characters long after the show was cancelled before eventually losing the rights to create Marvel-based games to Electronic Arts in 2001. Capcom, however, would reacquire the rights in 2008 and released Marvel vs. Capcom 3: Fate of Two Worlds in 2011.

 In film 
The series was credited for being responsible for the beginning development of the 2000 X-Men film. Fox Kids owner 20th Century Fox was impressed by the success of the TV show, and producer Lauren Shuler Donner purchased the film rights for them in 1994. The film's success led to the beginning of a film franchise which includes a series of sequels, prequels, and spin-offs for two decades up to 2020, when the series came to an end due to Disney's acquisition of Fox, with the character rights reverting to Marvel Studios.

In the 2022 Marvel Cinematic Universe film Doctor Strange in the Multiverse of Madness, produced by Marvel Studios, the theme song from the TV series (orchestrated by Danny Elfman and credited as X-Men '97 Theme) is played when Charles Xavier (portrayed by Patrick Stewart) first appears; in the film, unlike his previous performances as the character in Fox's X-Men franchise, Stewart's Xavier is visually redesigned to match his animated counterpart, complete with his iconic green suit, blue and black tie, and yellow hoverchair.

 In television 
In the Ms. Marvel episode "No Normal", set in the MCU, the theme song from the X-Men animated series is played when Kamala Khan discovers that she is a "mutant".

 Lawsuit 
On October 9, 2019, Hungarian immigrant Zoltan Krisko filed a lawsuit against Marvel Entertainment Group, Haim Saban, Shuki Levy, UMG Recordings, the current distributor of Disney Music Group and Fox Corporation. He claims the song was plagiarized from the theme song to the 1984–91 Hungarian action-adventure television series Linda'', which was composed by Gyorgy Vukan.

Notes

References

Sources

External links 

 
 
 DRG4's X-Men the Animated Series Page
 Marvel Animation Page Presents: X-Men
 X-Men TV series cast
 

1990s American animated television series
1990s Canadian animated television series
1992 American television series debuts
1997 American television series endings
1992 Canadian television series debuts
1997 Canadian television series endings
American children's animated action television series
American children's animated adventure television series
American children's animated science fantasy television series
American children's animated superhero television series
Animated television series based on Marvel Comics
Canadian children's animated action television series
Canadian children's animated adventure television series
Canadian children's animated science fantasy television series
Canadian children's animated superhero television series
English-language television shows
Fox Kids
Television shows adapted into comics
Television shows based on Marvel Comics
Television series about alien visitations
Television series by Saban Entertainment
UPN Kids
Works by Len Wein